The Independent Transport Workers Association of Nepal (ITWAN)  was a Nepalese trade union formed in 1979. The union existed as a separate entity until 1989, when it helped form the General Federation of Nepalese Trade Unions.

Trade unions in Nepal
Transport organisations based in Nepal

Trade unions established in 1979
1979 establishments in Nepal